Muradi railway station serves Muraddi, Ramchandrapur and the surrounding areas in Purulia  district in the Indian state of West Bengal.

History
The Bengal Nagpur Railway main line from Nagpur to Asansol, on the Howrah–Delhi main line, was opened for goods traffic on 1 February 1891.

Electrification
The Tatanagar–Adra–Asansol section was electrified in the 1957–1962 period. The Asansol–Purulia sector was electrified in 1961–62.

Economy
Baranti, a small tribal village near Muradi railway station, is developing as a tourist centre and part of tourism industry in Purulia.

Health 
Netaji Eye Hospital established by Swami Asimananda Saraswati at Ramchandrapur serves the rural people.

References

External links

Adra railway division
Railway stations in Purulia district
Railway stations in India opened in 1891